The Line 1 of Hefei Metro is an underground metro line in Hefei. The line began operation on 26 December 2016.

Opening timeline

Train service
There are 2 types of train services offered on the metro line 1:

  — 
  ←  (only on the last northbound train everyday)

Stations

Northern extension
Under Construction

References

01
2016 establishments in China
Railway lines opened in 2016